Eric Shaun Lynch  (March 11, 1975 – September 20, 2014), once known as Eric the Midget and later Eric the Actor,  was a member of The Howard Stern Show's Wack Pack.

Lynch used a motorized wheelchair for mobility. Despite his poor health, he claimed to have outlived every doctor's prediction for his life expectancy.

Medical conditions
Because of his short legs, weak joints, and a club foot, he employed a wheelchair to get around. His other conditions included stork bite which gave him a "blotchy" complexion and Ehlers–Danlos Syndrome, which resulted in gnarled fingers.

The Howard Stern Show
Eric initially called in on September 19, 2002, to discuss American Idol. Lynch had called to respond to Stern's statements that contestant Kelly Clarkson was not overly attractive. Eric was frequently at odds with The Howard Stern Show, its staff, its callers and its guests.

Eric made one in-studio appearance on November 3, 2008, alongside two prostitutes from the Bunny Ranch. Also present were Dixie Chicks singer Natalie Maines, wrestler Kurt Angle and American Idol alumna Diana DeGarmo.

Other media
Eric preferred to be called Eric the Actor. For legal reasons, Eric requested that his full official title be "Eric the Actor, formerly known as Eric the Midget" in order to protect the "Eric the Midget" trade name. Lynch made his television debut in a cameo on American Dreams in 2005.  Lynch also appeared on Fringe in 2010, In Plain Sight in 2012, and Legit in 2014. Eric appeared on Jimmy Kimmel Live! in 2008.

Eric also participated in a number of podcasting ventures.  He hosted American Idol and America's Got Talent wrap-up shows including an American Idol discussion show on Howard 101 which featured Brian Dunkleman as co-host.  He made appearances on TNA Wrestling's web offering TNA Today alongside wrestling personalities Mike Tenay and Jeremy Borash in 2012.

Death
On September 20, 2014, Lynch was admitted to a hospital because of heart problems. After arriving, Lynch's liver and kidneys began to shut down and he died.

On September 21, Lynch's longtime friend and manager Johnny Fratto became the first to report his death. Fratto tweeted "I am so sorry and so sad to inform everyone that my friend Eric "The Actor" Lynch passed away yesterday afternoon!!!"

News of Lynch's death received considerable media attention with outlets as high profile as Variety, The Hollywood Reporter, CNN and TMZ all reporting his death. Celebrities including Zach Braff, Zac Efron and Diana Degarmo among others Tweeted their condolences, with Eric's trademark sign-off "bye for now" trending number one as a Twitter Hashtag. Jimmy Kimmel was so upset by the news that he called The Stern Show first thing on September 22, even though he had an infant child and it was only 4:00am Pacific Daylight Time during the broadcast. Eric, a huge fan of WWE and the Oakland A's, was mourned during telecasts of both organizations, with the on-air personalities signing off the A's broadcast by saying "bye for now." Eric's roommate Jon spoke with Howard and encouraged fans to have Eric's favorite foods, Pepsi and bacon, in his honor.

Lynch was buried at Oakmont Memorial Park in Lafayette, California.

Filmography

References

External links

1975 births
2014 deaths
Actors with dwarfism
People with Ehlers–Danlos syndrome
American podcasters
American radio personalities
Entertainers with dwarfism
Sirius Satellite Radio
American male actors
People from Rodeo, California